Bébés à gogo , is a French comedy film from 1956, directed by Paul Mesnier, written by Marcel Franck, starring Jane Sourza and Louis de Funès. The film is known under the title:  "Babes a GoGo" (International English title).

Cast 
 Jane Sourza : Isabelle Petitbourgeois, wife
 Raymond Souplex : Stéphane Petitbourgeois, husband
 Louis de Funès : M. Célestin Ratier, representative of the industries of childhood
 Jean Carmet : Hubert, the husband of Stalemate
 Andréa Parisy : Pat, daughter of Isabelle and Stéphane
 Andrée Servilange : Geneviève, dite Mademoiselle, la nurse
 Marthe Alycia : Daphné, mother Hubert
 Arlette Massart : Jeannette, la bonne
 Florence Blot : l'employée de l'état civil à la mairie
 Saint-Granier : lui-même, en présentateur
 Valérie Vivin
 Pierre Vernet
 Max Desrau
 Max Revol
 Cécile Eddy
 Bernard Revon

References

External links 
 
 Bébés à gogo (1956) at the Films de France

1956 films
French comedy films
1950s French-language films
French black-and-white films
Films directed by Paul Mesnier
1956 comedy films
1950s French films